Paramecyna is a genus of beetles in the family Cerambycidae, containing the following species:

 Paramecyna delkeskampi Breuning, 1960
 Paramecyna kaszabi Breuning, 1967
 Paramecyna strandiella Breuning, 1940
 Paramecyna variegata Breuning, 1940
 Paramecyna x-signatum Aurivillius, 1910
 Paramecyna x-signatoides Breuning & Chelazzi, 1978

References

Apomecynini